Salix pyrenaica, the Pyrenean willow, is a species of flowering plant in the family Salicaceae, native to the Pyrenees and Cantabrian Mountains. A shrub or subshrub with procumbent main stems, and ascending branches usually reaching , it is occasionally available in commerce.

References

pyrenaica
Flora of Spain
Flora of France
Plants described in 1773